An Educational System for the Seventies, sometimes abbreviated as ES'70 or ES-70, was a research effort in the United States to develop a new secondary school curriculum for the 1970s.   It was jointly produced by 19 local school districts, their corresponding state agencies, and the U. S. Office of Education. The related report was published in 1969.

Involved districts 

 Atlanta, Georgia 
 Baltimore, Maryland
 Bloomfield Hills, Michigan 
 Boulder, Colorado 
 Breathitt County, Kentucky 
 Broward County, Florida - Nova High School
 Chicago (Archdiocese), Illinois
 Duluth, Minnesota 
 Houston, Texas
 Mamaroneck, New York - Mamaroneck High School
 Mineola, New York - Mineola High School
 Monroe, Michigan 
 Philadelphia - University City High School
 Portland, Oregon - John Adams High School
 Quincy, Massachusetts  
 San Antonio, Texas 
 San Mateo, California 
 Santa Fe, New Mexico -  Institute of American Indian Arts  
 Willingboro Township, New Jersey - John F. Kennedy High School

External links 

 An Educational System for the Seventies. Revised Edition. Interim Report, 1969-06-26
 ES'70 - A Systematic Approach to Educational Change, Robert M. Morgan, 1969-02-07
 ES '70: A SYSTEMS APPROACH TO EDUCATIONAL REFORM, David S. Bushnell, 1970-03-03

Secondary education in the United States
1969 documents
1969 in education
1969 in the United States
Educational research